The 2022–23 New York Rangers season is the franchise's 96th season of play and their 97th season overall.

During the off-season, the Rangers named Jacob Trouba the 28th captain in franchise history. Trouba became the first captain since Ryan McDonagh was traded during the 2017–18 season, and is also the 12th defenseman in franchise history to be named captain. He is the fourth consecutive U.S.-born player to be named captain after Chris Drury (2008–2011), Ryan Callahan (2011–2014) and McDonagh (2014–2018). Trouba served as an alternate captain the previous two years, while being lauded for his leadership abilities by previous Rangers head coach, David Quinn, and his successor, Gerard Gallant.

On March 14, 2023, the Rangers were featured in the first-ever live, animated NHL telecast called the "NHL Big City Greens Classic". ESPN, Disney Channel and the National Hockey League teamed up to showcase ice hockey to a younger audience. They took on the Washington Capitals and made history by winning the game 5–3, which featured characters from the award-winning cartoon playing for both teams.

Standings

Divisional standings

Conference standings

Schedule and results

Pre-season
The pre-season schedule was published on June 27, 2022.

|- style="background:#cfc;"
| 1 || September 26 || NY Islanders || 4–1 || || Shesterkin || Madison Square Garden || 14,776 || 1–0–0 || 
|- style="background:#fff;"
| 2 || September 27 || @ Boston || 2–3 || OT || Domingue || TD Garden || 17,850 || 1–0–1 || 
|- style="background:#fcc;"
| 3 || September 29 || New Jersey || 2–5 || || Shesterkin || Madison Square Garden || 14,237 || 1–1–1 || 
|- style="background:#cfc;"
| 4 || September 30 || @ New Jersey || 2–1 || || Halak || Prudential Center || 11,068 || 2–1–1 || 
|- style="background:#fcc;"
| 5 || October 5 || Boston || 4–5 || || Halak || Madison Square Garden || 13,759 || 2–2–1 || 
|- style="background:#fcc;"
| 6 || October 8 || @ NY Islanders || 1–3 || || Shesterkin || UBS Arena || 14,569 || 2–3–1 || 
|-

Regular season
The regular season schedule was published on July 6, 2022.

|- style="background:#cfc;"
| 1 || October 11 || Tampa Bay || 3–1 || || Shesterkin || Madison Square Garden || 18,006 || 1–0–0 || 2 || 
|- style="background:#cfc;"
| 2 || October 13 || @ Minnesota || 7–3 || || Shesterkin || Xcel Energy Center || 18,612 || 2–0–0 || 4 || 
|- style="background:#fcc;"
| 3 || October 14 || @ Winnipeg || 1–4 || || Halak || Canada Life Centre || 14,553 || 2–1–0 || 4 || 
|- style="background:#cfc;"
| 4 || October 17 || Anaheim || 6–4 || || Shesterkin || Madison Square Garden || 18,006 || 3–1–0 || 6 || 
|- style="background:#fff;"
| 5 || October 20 || San Jose || 2–3 || OT || Shesterkin || Madison Square Garden || 17,083 || 3–1–1 || 7 || 
|- style="background:#fcc;"
| 6 || October 23 || Columbus || 1–5 || || Halak || Madison Square Garden || 18,006 || 3–2–1 || 7 || 
|- style="background:#fff;"
| 7 || October 25 || Colorado || 2–3 || SO || Shesterkin || Madison Square Garden || 18,006 || 3–2–2 || 8 || 
|- style="background:#fcc;"
| 8 || October 26 || @ NY Islanders || 0–3 || || Halak || UBS Arena || 17,255 || 3–3–2 || 8 || 
|- style="background:#cfc;"
| 9 || October 29 || @ Dallas || 6–3 || || Shesterkin || American Airlines Center || 18,532 || 4–3–2 || 10 || 
|- style="background:#cfc;"
| 10 || October 30 || @ Arizona || 3–2 || || Shesterkin || Mullett Arena || 4,600 || 5–3–2 || 12 || 
|-

|- style="background:#cfc;"
| 11 || November 1 || Philadelphia || 1–0 || OT || Shesterkin || Madison Square Garden || 17,206 || 6–3–2 || 14 || 
|- style="background:#fcc;"
| 12 || November 3 || Boston || 2–5 || || Shesterkin || Madison Square Garden || 18,006 || 6–4–2 || 14 || 
|- style="background:#fff;"
| 13 || November 6 || Detroit || 2–3 || OT || Halak || Madison Square Garden || 18,006 || 6–4–3 || 15 || 
|- style="background:#fcc;"
| 14 || November 8 || NY Islanders || 3–4 || || Shesterkin || Madison Square Garden || 18,006 || 6–5–3 || 15 || 
|- style="background:#cfc;"
| 15 || November 10 || @ Detroit || 8–2 || || Shesterkin || Little Caesars Arena || 18,869 || 7–5–3 || 17 || 
|- style="background:#fcc;"
| 16 || November 12 || @ Nashville || 1–2 || || Halak || Bridgestone Arena || 17,169 || 7–6–3 || 17 || 
|- style="background:#cfc;"
| 17 || November 13 || Arizona || 4–1 || || Shesterkin || Madison Square Garden || 18,006 || 8–6–3 || 19 || 
|- style="background:#fff;"
| 18 || November 17 || @ Seattle || 2–3 || OT || Shesterkin || Climate Pledge Arena || 17,151 || 8–6–4 || 20 || 
|- style="background:#cfc;"
| 19 || November 19 || @ San Jose || 2–1 || || Shesterkin || SAP Center || 17,562 || 9–6–4 || 22 || 
|- style="background:#cfc;"
| 20 || November 22 || @ Los Angeles || 5–3 || || Shesterkin || Crypto.com Arena || 18,230 || 10–6–4 || 24 || 
|- style="background:#fcc;"
| 21 || November 23 || @ Anaheim || 2–3 || || Halak || Honda Center || 13,759 || 10–7–4 || 24 || 
|- style="background:#fcc;"
| 22 || November 26 || Edmonton || 3–4 || || Shesterkin || Madison Square Garden || 18,006 || 10–8–4 || 24 || 
|- style="background:#fcc;"
| 23 || November 28 || New Jersey || 3–5 || || Shesterkin || Madison Square Garden || 17,928 || 10–9–4 || 24 || 
|- style="background:#cfc;"
| 24 || November 30 || @ Ottawa || 3–1 || || Halak || Canadian Tire Centre || 14,654 || 11–9–4 || 26 || 
|-

|- style="background:#fff;"
| 25 || December 2 || Ottawa || 2–3 || OT || Shesterkin || Madison Square Garden || 18,006 || 11–9–5 || 27 || 
|- style="background:#fcc;"
| 26 || December 3 || Chicago || 2–5 || || Halak || Madison Square Garden || 18,006 || 11–10–5 || 27 || 
|- style="background:#cfc;"
| 27 || December 5 || St. Louis || 6–4 || || Shesterkin || Madison Square Garden || 16,682 || 12–10–5 || 29 || 
|- style="background:#cfc;"
| 28 || December 7 || @ Vegas || 5–1 || || Shesterkin || T-Mobile Arena || 17,939 || 13–10–5 || 31 || 
|- style="background:#cfc;"
| 29 || December 9 || @ Colorado || 2–1 || SO || Shesterkin || Ball Arena || 18,112 || 14–10–5 || 33 || 
|- style="background:#cfc;"
| 30 || December 12 || New Jersey || 4–3 || OT || Shesterkin || Madison Square Garden || 18,006 || 15–10–5 || 35 || 
|- style="background:#cfc;"
| 31 || December 15 || Toronto || 3–1 || || Shesterkin || Madison Square Garden || 18,006 || 16–10–5 || 37 || 
|- style="background:#cfc;"
| 32 || December 17 || @ Philadelphia || 6–3 || || Halak || Wells Fargo Center || 18,340 || 17–10–5 || 39 || 
|- style="background:#cfc;"
| 33 || December 18 || @ Chicago || 7–1 || || Shesterkin || United Center || 17,365 || 18–10–5 || 41 || 
|- style="background:#fcc;"
| 34 || December 20 || @ Pittsburgh || 2–3 || || Shesterkin || PPG Paints Arena || 18,005 || 18–11–5 || 41 || 
|- style="background:#cfc;"
| 35 || December 22 || NY Islanders || 5–3 || || Shesterkin || Madison Square Garden || 18,006 || 19–11–5 || 43 || 
|- style="background:#fcc;"
| 36 || December 27 || Washington || 0–4 || || Shesterkin || Madison Square Garden || 18,006 || 19–12–5 || 43 || 
|- style="background:#fff;"
| 37 || December 29 || @ Tampa Bay || 1–2 || SO || Shesterkin || Amalie Arena || 19,092 || 19–12–6 || 44 || 
|-

|- style="background:#cfc;"
| 38 || January 1 || @ Florida || 5–3 || || Halak || FLA Live Arena || 18,272 || 20–12–6 || 46 || 
|- style="background:#cfc;"
| 39 || January 3 || Carolina || 5–3 || || Shesterkin || Madison Square Garden || 17,747 || 21–12–6 || 48 || 
|- style="background:#cfc;"
| 40 || January 5 || @ Montreal || 4–1 || || Halak || Bell Centre || 21,105 || 22–12–6 || 50 || 
|- style="background:#fff;"
| 41 || January 7 || @ New Jersey || 3–4 || OT || Shesterkin || Prudential Center || 16,514 || 22–12–7 || 51 || 
|- style="background:#cfc;"
| 42 || January 10 || Minnesota || 4–3 || SO || Shesterkin || Madison Square Garden || 18,006 || 23–12–7 || 53 || 
|- style="background:#cfc;"
| 43 || January 12 || Dallas || 2–1 || OT || Shesterkin || Madison Square Garden || 18,006 || 24–12–7 || 55 || 
|- style="background:#fcc;"
| 44 || January 15 || Montreal || 1–2 || || Shesterkin || Madison Square Garden || 18,006 || 24–13–7 || 55 || 
|- style="background:#cfc;"
| 45 || January 16 || @ Columbus || 3–1 || || Halak || Nationwide Arena || 17,024 || 25–13–7 || 57 || 
|- style="background:#fcc;"
| 46 || January 19 || Boston || 1–3 || || Shesterkin || Madison Square Garden || 18,006 || 25–14–7 || 57 || 
|- style="background:#cfc;"
| 47 || January 23 || Florida || 6–2 || || Shesterkin || Madison Square Garden || 17,121 || 26–14–7 || 59 || 
|- style="background:#fff;"
| 48 || January 25 || @ Toronto || 2–3 || OT || Shesterkin || Scotiabank Arena || 18,114 || 26–14–8 || 60 || 
|- style="background:#cfc;"
| 49 || January 27 || Vegas || 4–1 || || Halak || Madison Square Garden || 18,006 || 27–14–8 || 62 || 
|-

|- style="background:#cfc;"
| 50 || February 6 || Calgary || 5–4 || OT || Halak || Madison Square Garden || 17,173 || 28–14–8 || 64 || 
|- style="background:#cfc;"
| 51 || February 8 || Vancouver || 4–3 || || Shesterkin || Madison Square Garden || 18,006 || 29–14–8 || 66 || 
|- style="background:#cfc;"
| 52 || February 10 || Seattle || 6–3 || || Shesterkin || Madison Square Garden || 18,006 || 30–14–8 || 68 || 
|- style="background:#cfc;"
| 53 || February 11 || @ Carolina || 6–2 || || Halak || PNC Arena || 18,808 || 31–14–8 || 70 || 
|- style="background:#cfc;"
| 54 || February 15 || @ Vancouver || 6–4 || || Shesterkin || Rogers Arena || 18,404 || 32–14–8 || 72 || 
|- style="background:#cfc;"
| 55 || February 17 || @ Edmonton || 5–4 || SO || Shesterkin || Rogers Place || 18,347 || 33–14–8 || 74 || 
|- style="background:#fff;"
| 56 || February 18 || @ Calgary || 2–3 || OT || Halak || Scotiabank Saddledome || 19,206 || 33–14–9 || 75 || 
|- style="background:#fcc;"
| 57 || February 20 || Winnipeg || 1–4 || || Shesterkin || Madison Square Garden || 18,006 || 33–15–9 || 75 || 
|- style="background:#fcc;"
| 58 || February 23 || @ Detroit || 1–4 || || Halak || Little Caesars Arena || 19,116 || 33–16–9 || 75 || 
|- style="background:#fcc;"
| 59 || February 25 || @ Washington || 3–6 || || Shesterkin || Capital One Arena || 18,573 || 33–17–9 || 75 || 
|- style="background:#cfc;"
| 60 || February 26 || Los Angeles || 5–2 || || Shesterkin || Madison Square Garden || 18,006 || 34–17–9 || 77 || 
|-

|- style="background:#cfc;"
| 61 || March 1 || @ Philadelphia || 3–2 || OT || Shesterkin || Wells Fargo Center || 19,534 || 35–17–9 || 79 || 
|- style="background:#fcc;"
| 62 || March 2 || Ottawa || 3–5 || || Halak || Madison Square Garden || 18,006 || 35–18–9 || 79 || 
|- style="background:#fcc;"
| 63 || March 4 || @ Boston || 2–4 || || Shesterkin || TD Garden || 17,850 || 35–19–9 || 79 || 
|- style="background:#cfc;"
| 64 || March 9 || @ Montreal || 4–3 || SO || Shesterkin || Bell Centre || 21,105 || 36–19–9 || 81 || 
|- style="background:#cfc;"
| 65 || March 11 || @ Buffalo || 2–1 || OT || Shesterkin || KeyBank Center || 19,070 || 37–19–9 || 83 || 
|- style="background:#fff;"
| 66 || March 12 || @ Pittsburgh || 2–3 || OT || Halak || PPG Paints Arena || 18,364 || 37–19–10 || 84 || 
|- style="background:#cfc;"
| 67 || March 14 || Washington || 5–3 || || Shesterkin || Madison Square Garden || 17,476 || 38–19–10 || 86 || 
|- style="background:#cfc;"
| 68 || March 16 || Pittsburgh || 4–2 || || Shesterkin || Madison Square Garden || 18,006 || 39–19–10 || 88 || 
|- style="background:#cfc;"
| 69 || March 18 || Pittsburgh || 6–0 || || Shesterkin || Madison Square Garden || 18,006 || 40–19–10 || 90 || 
|- style="background:#cfc;"
| 70 || March 19 || Nashville || 7–0 || || Halak || Madison Square Garden || 18,006 || 41–19–10 || 92 || 
|- style="background:#;"
| 71 || March 21 || Carolina || – || || || Madison Square Garden || || || || 
|- style="background:#;"
| 72 || March 23 || @ Carolina || – || || || PNC Arena || || || || 
|- style="background:#;"
| 73 || March 25 || @ Florida || – || || || FLA Live Arena || || || || 
|- style="background:#;"
| 74 || March 28 || Columbus || – || || || Madison Square Garden || || || || 
|- style="background:#;"
| 75 || March 30 || @ New Jersey || – || || || Prudential Center || || || || 
|- style="background:#;"
| 76 || March 31 || @ Buffalo || – || || || KeyBank Center || || || || 
|-

|- style="background:#;"
| 77 || April 2 || @ Washington || – || || || Capital One Arena || || || || 
|- style="background:#;"
| 78 || April 5 || Tampa Bay || – || || || Madison Square Garden || || || || 
|- style="background:#;"
| 79 || April 6 || @ St. Louis || – || || || Enterprise Center || || || || 
|- style="background:#;"
| 80 || April 8 || @ Columbus || – || || || Nationwide Arena || || || || 
|- style="background:#;"
| 81 || April 10 || Buffalo || – || || || Madison Square Garden || || || || 
|- style="background:#;"
| 82 || April 13 || Toronto || – || || || Madison Square Garden || || || || 
|-

|-
|

Player statistics
As of March 19, 2023

Skaters

Goaltenders

Roster

Awards and honors

Milestones

Records

Transactions
The Rangers have been involved in the following transactions during the 2022–23 season.

Trades

Free agents

Waivers

Signings

Draft picks

Below are the New York Rangers' selections at the 2022 NHL Entry Draft, which was held on July 7 and 8, 2022, at Bell Centre in Montreal.

Notes:
 The Colorado Avalanche's third-round pick went to the New York Rangers as the result of a trade on July 7, 2022, that sent Alexandar Georgiev to Colorado in exchange for a third-round pick in 2023, a fifth-round pick in 2022 and this pick.
 The Winnipeg Jets' fourth-round pick went to the New York Rangers as the result of a trade on July 17, 2021, that sent Brett Howden to the Vegas Golden Knights in exchange for Nick DeSimone and this pick.
 The Colorado Avalanche's fifth-round pick went to the New York Rangers as the result of a trade on July 7, 2022, that sent Alexandar Georgiev to Colorado in exchange for a third-round pick in both 2022 and 2023 and this pick.

Notes

References

New York Rangers seasons
New York Rangers
New York Rangers
New York Rangers
New York Rangers
2020s in Manhattan
Madison Square Garden